Abdeslam Hili (born 19 December 1996) is a Moroccan para-athlete who specializes in sprints. He represented Morocco at the 2020 Summer Paralympics.

Career
Hili represented Morocco in the 400 metres T12 event at the 2020 Summer Paralympics and won a gold medal.

References

1996 births
Living people
Sportspeople from Casablanca
Paralympic athletes of Morocco
Moroccan male sprinters
Athletes (track and field) at the 2020 Summer Paralympics
Medalists at the 2020 Summer Paralympics
Paralympic gold medalists for Morocco
Paralympic medalists in athletics (track and field)